Calycosiphonia macrochlamys is a species of plant in the family Rubiaceae. It is found in Cameroon, the Democratic Republic of the Congo, Equatorial Guinea, Gabon, and Ghana. Its natural habitat is subtropical or tropical moist lowland forests. It is threatened by habitat loss.

References

macrochlamys
Vulnerable plants
Flora of Ghana
Flora of Cameroon
Flora of Equatorial Guinea
Flora of Africa
Taxonomy articles created by Polbot